Songs Of Life is the second studio album by the Milwaukee-based rock band The Gufs. It was released in 1992 and may be classified as alternative music.

Track listing
All tracks by The Gufs

"Life's Sweet Sound" - 4:42
"Lay You Down" - 4:38
"For A Ride" - 5:29
"Everything" - 4:47
"Danielle" - 5:02
"Kiss The Sky" - 4:40
"My Copper Circus" - 1:49
"Song Of Life" - 4:17
"She Says" - 3:13
"The Chosen" - 5:19
"When Time Comes" - 4:47
"Lullaby" - 3:09
"Don't Look Away" - 4:31
"Blindfold Removed" - 1:01

Personnel 

 Goran Kralj - lead vocals
 Dejan Kralj - bass guitar
 Morgan Dawley - lead guitar, backup vocals
 Scott Schwebel - drums

External links
The Gufs Official Website

Notes

1992 albums
The Gufs albums